San Pablo is an unincorporated community located in Costilla County, Colorado, United States. The San Luis post office  serves San Pablo postal addresses. San Pablo is located in the Rio Culebra valley of the Sangre de Cristo Land Grant which was awarded to the family of Carlos Beaubien in 1843.

Geography
San Pablo is located at  (37.147182,-105.394764).

Historic Buildings and Areas
Catholic Church 
Presbyterian Church 
School

Notable person
Edward Vigil, member of the Colorado House of Representatives

See also
 Old Spanish National Historic Trail
 List of cities and towns in Colorado

References

Unincorporated communities in Costilla County, Colorado
Unincorporated communities in Colorado